Lochaber RFC is a rugby union side based in Fort William, Scotland. The club was founded in 1969. They play at the Banavie ground.

History
Founded in 1969 by a group of local rugby loving business men the club played on various temporary pitches over the years until 1984 when the local council commissioned an official rugby pitch (15 years after the Club was reformed). 

Lochaber Rugby club has always been fortunate to have volunteers and members with a ‘can do’ attitude who are willing to help with the running of the club and over the next three years a huge amount of hard work was put into to raise funds to build a Pavilion.

The first clubhouse was built with old cabins purchased from the BA at the end of the contract for the new Furnace Room. It was always seen as a temporary measure and in 1997 with the a combination of funding packages the new Clubhouse was opened.

The club fields a 1XV Team, Ladies Team, U18's, U16's and offers rugby to players of all abilities (boys and girls) from Primary 3 upwards.  Three female players from Lochaber R.F.C. have International Caps, i.e. Rachael (Nicolson) Whyte, Helen Nelson and Katie Dougan.  They have a great reputation for  being a small friendly club with great food being served to visiting teams after the match .

Lochaber Sevens
The club host an annual rugby Sevens tournament.

Honours
 Lochaber Sevens
 Champions: 1981, 1987, 1990
 Bearsden Sevens
 Champions: 1993
 West Regional Bowl Winners 2019

References 

Rugby union in Highland
Scottish rugby union teams
Fort William, Highland
Rugby clubs established in 1969